Ayanda Dlamini (born 11 October 1984 in Ulundi, KwaZulu-Natal) is a former South African football striker. He currently coaches AmaZulu Reserve. Dlamini played for AmaZulu from 2009 to 2016. He had a brief spell at Bloemfontein Celtic from 2016 to 2017. He hails from Kwa-Ceza near Ulundi in the KwaZulu-Natal province.

References

1984 births
Living people
People from Ulundi Local Municipality
Zulu people
South African soccer players
Association football forwards
AmaZulu F.C. players